Murray's Revenge is the second collaboration album from California rapper Murs (of Living Legends) and North Carolina producer 9th Wonder (formerly of Little Brother).

Like their first collaboration Murs 3:16: The 9th Edition, the album features ten songs, all produced by 9th Wonder, and is less than 40 minutes long. This effort was Murs' most commercially successful release, being his first to break into the Billboard 200 album chart. It debuted at No. 166 on the Billboard 200 and No. 70 on Top R&B/Hip-Hop Albums.  It has sold 46,000 copies in the US as July 2008. The album features guest appearances from Joe Scudda and Big Pooh. Murray's Revenge featured music videos for "L.A." "Yesterday & Today" and "Murray's Revenge." The album is profanity free.

Track listing
Unless otherwise indicated, Information is based on the album's Liner Notes

Personnel
Information is based on the album's Liner Notes

Nick "Murs" Carter – lead vocals
Patrick "9th Wonder" Douthit – additional instruments, producer, recording engineer, audio mixing
Thomas "Rapper Big Pooh" Jones III – guest vocals (4)
Paul Gomez – A&R
Joseph "Joe Scudda" Griffen – guest vocals (3)
Gabriela López – art direction, design
Dan Monick – art direction, additional photography
Mike Piscitelli – cover photography, design
Ryan Whalley – A&R

Charts

References

External links

2006 albums
Murs (rapper) albums
Albums produced by 9th Wonder